Devoll is a river in southern Albania.
It is one of the source rivers of Seman. Its source is in the southwestern corner of the Devoll municipality, close to the Greek border. It flows initially northeast, through Miras, then north through Bilisht, and northwest through Progër, Pojan (in the northern Korçë Plain which was marshy until after the World War II), Maliq, Moglicë, Kodovjat, Gramsh, where it is stowed in a big lake and Gostimë, where it turns south. It joins the Osum near Kuçovë, to form the Seman. The Seman opens into a small delta south of the Karavasta lagoon in the Adriatic sea.

A number of hydroelectricity plants on the river Devoll are planned or under construction. The Albanian company Devoll Hydropower, owned and operated by the Norwegian power company Statkraft, is building two hydroelectricity plants near Banjë (Banjë Hydro Power Plant) and near Moglicë (Moglicë Hydro Power Plant), with combined capacity 242 MW. The decision whether a third plant near Kokel is to be built, will be taken when the first two dams are completed.

At an unspecified location in the valley of Devoll, Bohemund of Taranto and the Byzantine Emperor Alexius I made an agreement in 1108, in the wake of the First Crusade. This treaty is named after the Byzantine fortress of Devol, modern Albania. Although the treaty was not immediately enforced, it was intended to make the Principality of Antioch a vassal state of the Byzantine Empire.

During 1970 significant amounts of water from the river was diverted into the Small Prespa Lake with the intention to use it latter during the summer time for the irrigation purposes. Due to the high suspended solids in the river water significant siltation did occur on the Albanian side. The practice has recently stopped.

See also   
 Geography of Albania
 Rivers of Albania

References 

Rivers of Albania
Geography of Berat County
Geography of Elbasan County
Geography of Korçë County
Braided rivers in Albania